Hudenje is a small settlement east of Dobruška Vas in the Municipality of Škocjan in southeastern Slovenia. The area is part of the historical region of Lower Carniola and is now included in the Southeast Slovenia Statistical Region. Within the municipality, the village belongs to the Village Community of Grmovlje.

References

External links
Hudenje at Geopedia

Populated places in the Municipality of Škocjan